Robertville is an unincorporated community in Gloucester County, New Brunswick, Canada.

Situated northwest of the outskirts of Bathurst, it is mostly surrounded by forest. Among other communities in the surroundings are Beresford, Petit Rocher, Nigadoo, North Tetagouche, South Tetagouche, Pointe Verte, and Rough Waters.

Education
The elementary school of Robertville is École La Croisée de Robertville ("La Croisée" is French for "The Crossing", referring to the four corners intersection where the school is situated and was named by a student (Jason Mansour) after he won a contest to find the school a name).

French speaking people from Robertville (and the surroundings) generally go to École Secondaire Népisiguit (ESN - The French Highschool) in the City of Bathurst, and the few English people from Robertville (and the surroundings, predominantly in Bathurst) go to Bathurst High School (BHS).

History

Established in 1884 by a Roman Catholic priest by the name of François-Antoine Robert, its residents are predominantly francophone.

Notable people

See also
List of communities in New Brunswick

References

Communities in Gloucester County, New Brunswick
Designated places in New Brunswick
Local service districts of Gloucester County, New Brunswick